is a city located in northeastern Kagoshima Prefecture, Japan. It is near Miyakonojō, Miyazaki.

As of April 2017, the city has an estimated population of 37,038 and a population density of 95 persons per km². This is down from the 2006 population data, which was an estimated population of 43,752 and a population density of 112 persons per km². The total area is 390.39 km². Soo is one of the many small cities in Japan that have a steadily decreasing population.

Geography
Much of Soo is mountainous and covered with forest. It rains, but it rarely snows. Soo is located in Kagoshima so it also receives ash from its volcanoes, most notably: Shinmoedake and Sakurajima. Soo is a land-locked city and is in middle of the Ōsumi Peninsula.

History
The modern city of Soo was established on July 1, 2005, from the merger of the towns of Ōsumi (Iwagawa), Sueyoshi and Takarabe (all from Soo District).

Transportation

Air
The closest airport is Kagoshima Airport which is located in Kirishima.

Train
All of Soo had a train system, but due to low use most of it was torn out and paved into a running path. There are three small un-staffed train stations in Takarabe (Northern Soo) that connect to trains going to Miyazaki Prefecture and to Kagoshima City. They are: Takarabe Station, Kitamata Station, and Ōsumi-Ōkawara Station

Buses
There is one bus that travels from Miyakonojo through Soo to Kanoya, and another one that travels to Shibushi.

Roads
Like many other places in Kagoshima Prefecture, Soo is home to many narrow mountain roads and so has a high rate of traffic accidents. There is also a few bus routes through Soo.  Due to the sparse public transport most people in Soo drive cars.

Expressways
The Higashi Kyushu Expressway starts at Soo Yagoro in southern Soo. It connects all the way to Expressways in Kumamoto, Miyazaki and Kagoshima City. From Iwagawa (Yogoro entrance) to Sueyoshi it is free. From Sueyoshi on it is a Toll Express Way.

Commerce
Sueyoshi is famous throughout Japan for producing Yuzu (a citronella).  Ōsumi is known for its Chinese cabbage and watermelons. Soo City in general also raises black pork and beef which is the local delicacy. Before it closed, the high school in Takarabe was an agriculture school, reflecting the importance of the agriculture industry in the area.

Education
There are 20 Elementary schools, 5 Junior High schools, and 1 High school in Soo City.

Sueyoshi has 9 Elementary schools, 1 Junior High school, and 1 High school.
Ōsumi has 7 Elementary schools and 1 Junior High school.
Takarabe has 4 Elementary schools, 1 Junior High school.

Beginning with the 2012–2013 school year, small Jr High schools will be absorbed into the larger schools, resulting in all areas of Soo City having only one Jr High each (Ōsumi already went through this process 4 years ago). 
Takarabe went through this change in 2012.

Currently the Elementary and Jr High schools in the areas of Ōsumi and Takarabe are taught by ALT's (Assistant Language Teacher) hired through the JET Programme.  The ALT in Sueyoshi is a direct hire.  The high school in Soo City is visited by the same ALT from the JET Programme.

Recreation
There are many points of interest and Festivals that can be visited in Soo City.

Yagorou Statue
In Iwagawa there is the Legend of Yagorou, which is represented by a very tall statue on a hill near the bypass on the way to Kanoya from Miyakonojo. Near the statue is a restaurant, an onsen, and a visitors center. Also near the statue is Ōsumi's Michi no Eki where many locally grown foods and teas can be bought. In spring all of the cherry trees on the hill bloom and it is a popular spot to view them.

Yagorou Festival
Every year on November 3 there are 3 different festivals (Matsuri) dedicated to Yagoroudon. One in Soo (Ōsumi), one in Nichinan, and one in Yamanokuchi (both in Miyazaki Prefecture).  
The town has a smaller statue of Yagorou (just over 4 meters tall) that is pulled from the  through town. This festival is called the Yagorou Festival or the Yagorodon Festival.

The mobile statue of Yagorou pulled through Ōsumi is the second largest of the three Yagorou festivals.  The largest is in Nichinan (just over 7 meters tall), and the smallest is in Yamanokuchi.  It is said that there were 3 Yagoroudon brothers, hence the three different locations of festivals (one for each brother).

Ookawara Gorge
 has campsites and a little village where cabins can be rented. It is in Takarabe, and it hosts a waterfall called Kirihara Falls (桐原の滝 "Kirihara-no-taki") that is lit up at night. There are also many scenic ponds at the base of the waterfall with many places to picnic.

Iwaya Buddha
One of the eight views of Kannon that can be seen in Soo (according to the sign at the trail head down to the Iwaya Buddha). It was carved hundreds of years ago and is reached by climbing down many stairs to a cliff face above a river.

Mizo no Kuchi
 is located in Takarabe and is a tunnel made long ago through erosion. it is 13.8 meters tall and 8.6 meters long.

Festival
At the festival school children dance through the tunnel in traditional costumes.

Yabusame Festival
Every year on November 23 at  there is a Yabusame festival. Originally, a student from the local junior high school was selected three months prior to the festival. Then he trained to shoot arrows on horseback for the festival. In many cases he had never touched a horse before he was selected, let alone ridden a horse before. How many shots he made was supposed to show how good the harvest will be for the year.

For at least the past 4 years, however, two girls have been the riders/shooters for the festival.  Starting when they were in Jr. High school, they practice riding and shooting a few months before the festival.  A third girl, currently a 6th grade student, has been shooting at the past two festivals, and a 5th grade boy began riding, but not shooting, at last year's festival.

Onioi Festival
Onioi is a festival or ceremony in which the demons are driven out in order to let good luck in.

References

External links
  
 Pamphlet about Soo City 
 
 

Cities in Kagoshima Prefecture